Heinrich Gutkin (13 June 1879, in Tallinn – 11 October 1941, in Sverdlovsk Oblast) was a trader and the Estonian National Assembly member.

Heinrich Gutkin was a chairman of the Jewish Union Bank in Tallinn, a clothing store owner and a founding member of the Estonian Chamber of Commerce and Industry from 1925 to 1937. He also a chairman of the Jewish Cultural Self-Administration Office. It was the first time that a Jew was appointed to the upper house.

Gutkin was arrested by Soviet security services on 14 June 1941, his property confiscated and was deported to a prison camp in the Soviet Union, where he subsequently died.

References

1879 births
1941 deaths
People from Tallinn
People from Kreis Harrien
Estonian Jews
Members of the Estonian National Assembly
Estonian businesspeople
Estonian people who died in Soviet detention
People who died in the Gulag
Jewish Gulag detainees